Frivolous Wife is a 2008 South Korean romantic comedy film based on William Shakespeare's The Taming of the Shrew.

Plot
Cheon Yeon-soo is a beautiful, hot-headed college girl whose family became millionaires overnight. She was raised by an over-indulgent father and grew up spoiled. Yeon-soo is used to getting any man she wants, but she falls in love with her polar opposite: awkward and polite Lee Jeong-do. Jeong-do is the only grandson of a very traditional family, and Yeon-soo attempts to transform herself into a proper lady so that her future in-laws will accept her. Little does she know that Jeong-do's family actually heads a notorious mob.

Cast
Park Jung-ah as Cheon Yeon-soo 
Park Jin-woo as Lee Jeong-do
Jang Min-ho as Grandfather
Lee Won-jong as Yeon-soo's father
Jo Sang-gook as Head of the family
Yang Geum-seok as Aunt-in-law
Lee Il-hwa as Aunt-in-law
Lee Il-jae as Na Dae-jin
Lee Sang-hoon as In-seok
Kim Tae-ho as Bong-doo
Son Ji-won as Ji-won
Choi Yoon-jung as Tyrannical teacher
Choi Jae-ho as Hypnotist
Kim Hyeon-ki
Kim Jong-seok
Kim Neul-mae

References

External links 
  
 
 
 

2008 films
South Korean romantic comedy films
2008 romantic comedy films
Films based on The Taming of the Shrew
Lotte Entertainment films
2000s South Korean films